Mechlin is the English name for the city of Mechelen in Belgium.
Mechlin lace, a type of lace originally produced in Mechelen

Mechlin may also refer to:

Mechlin, Greater Poland Voivodeship (west-central Poland)
Mechlin, Masovian Voivodeship (east-central Poland)

See also
Mechelen (disambiguation)